Nobumoto (written: 信本) is a Japanese surname. Notable people with the surname include:

 (born 1964), Japanese anime screenwriter

Nobumoto (written: 信元) is also a masculine Japanese given name. Notable people with the name include:

 (died 1576), Japanese daimyō

Japanese-language surnames
Japanese masculine given names